Sauce for the Mongoose: The Story of a Real-Life Rikki-tikki-tavi by Bruce Kinloch is a non-fiction tale of how a family adopts a baby mongoose who they name "Pipa", the word for barrel in Swahili.

The book also contains black and white plates in the center with pictures of the author, his family and Pipa.

1964 non-fiction books
Indian non-fiction books
Mongooses
20th-century Indian books